The Bayerische Flugzeugwerke M 18 (BFW M 18), (later known as Messerschmitt M 18) was an airliner, produced in Germany in the late 1920s.

Design and development
Designed at the request of Theodor Croneiss to supply his new airline venture which was to become Nordbayerische Verkehrsflug (NOBA), it was a conventional high-wing cantilever monoplane with fixed tailskid undercarriage. The prototype was built of wood, although production examples would have a metal structure. The design was praised in its day for the cleanness of its aerodynamics, lightness of construction, and economy of operation

Operational history

The first M 18 to enter service with NOBA was provided by Messerschmitt in exchange for a 49% share of the new company, and on 26 July it began commercial flights. NOBA's early successes enabled the company to place orders for additional examples of an improved model, the M 18b. It would eventually purchase twelve of these, but manufacturing them would exceed the capacity of Messerschmitt's own small firm, leading to a merger with Bayerische Flugzeugwerke (BFW) in 1927. Following NOBA's reorganisation into DEVAG in 1931, a small number of a further-improved version, designated M 18d, were ordered, but the type was soon superseded by the similar but larger Messerschmitt M 20.

Variants
M 18a three-seat production version with  Siemens-Halske Sh 11 engine (two built)
M 18bthree/four-seat production version with  Siemens-Halske Sh 12 engine (12 built)
M 18c photographic survey version with  Armstrong Siddeley Lynx engine (two or three built)
M 18d enlarged six/seven/eight-passenger version, produced with a variety of engines, including the  Armstrong Siddely Lynx,  Walter Mars and  Wright Whirlwind. (eight built)

Operators

Swiss Air Force

Specifications (M 18d)

Notes

1920s German airliners
M 18
Single-engined tractor aircraft
High-wing aircraft
Aircraft first flown in 1926